The 2016 season is the 106th season of competitive football in Paraguay.

Primera División

Transfers

 List of transfers during the 2016 season registered under the Asociación Paraguaya de Fútbol.

 
Seasons in Paraguayan football